Atakan is a Turkish surname and given name, from  "ancestor" and  "blood".

People with this given name include:
Atakan Alaftargil (born 1976), Turkish alpine skier
Atakan Yüksel (born 1985), Turkish wrestler
Atakan Cangöz (born 1992, Turkish football midfielder (Serik Belediyespor)
Atakan Karazor (born 1996), German football midfielder (VfB Stuttgart)
Atakan Çankaya (born 1998), Turkish football midfielder (Ankaragücü)
Atakan Akkaynak (born 1999), German football midfielder (Çaykur Rizespor)
Atakan Üner (born 1999), Turkish football winger (Ümraniyespor)
Atakan Gündüz (born 2001), Turkish football defender (Trabzonspor)

People with this surname include:
Nancy Atakan (born 1946), American artist who has lived in Turkey since 1969
Ruzen Atakan (born 1966), Turkish Cypriot painter

Turkish-language surnames
Turkish masculine given names